Nectandra apiculata is a species of plant in the family Lauraceae. It is endemic to Bolivia.

References

apiculata
Endemic flora of Bolivia
Vulnerable flora of South America
Taxonomy articles created by Polbot